St. Joseph Communications is a Canadian communications company based out of Toronto.

It is one of Canada's largest privately owned communications and media companies. The company currently has three divisions:
 The print business - SJC Print
 The full production agency - SJC Content
 The media business, a family of brands - SJC Media.

Tony Gagliano is Executive Chairman and CEO of the company. Other executives at the corporation include John Gagliano, President of SJC Print and Vice-Chairman SJC; Kin-Man Lee, CFO. The corporation has 1300 employees.

History

St. Joseph Communications was founded in 1956 by Gaetano Gagliano as a printing house. Gagliano and his growing family emigrated from Italy shortly after the war. He initially found work laying track for CP Rail, but could not forget about his lifelong dream of becoming a printer. So in 1956, he started a small print business in the basement of his family home. He specialized in letterpress work such as birth announcements, invitations and business cards. He expanded business through new equipment and technology, strategic acquisitions and bigger facilities. By the 1980s, St. Joseph Print was one of the largest privately owned print companies in Canada, and growth continued in the 1990s and early 2000s. In addition to printing, the company expanded into photography, content creation, publishing, and media.

Media
SJC's Media division was established in 2001 with the acquisition of Multi-Vision Publishing, and expanded further the following year with the acquisition of Key Media.

Its original brands include Fashion Magazine, and Toronto Life, as well as Mariage Québec, Ottawa Magazine, and Wedding Bells.

The company also previously published Saturday Night, Elm Street, Books for Everybody, The Look, and Shift. In March 2011, St. Joseph Media acquired the Toronto blog Torontoist.com, which it resold to Daily Hive in 2019.

On March 20, 2019 SJC Media agreed to acquire Rogers Media's Publishing assets from Rogers Communications. Once the deal was finalized, St. Joseph Communications took ownership of Maclean's, Chatelaine (English), Châtelaine (French), Today's Parent, Hello! Canada, Canadian Business, and Flare.

Media Brands 

L'actualité médicale
L'actualité pharmaceutique
Canadian Business
Châtelaine
Chatelaine
The Directory of Restaurant & Fast Food Chains
The Directory of Retail Chains
Emballages, Les Nouvelles
Enfants Quebec
Flare
Gestion Santé
glow
glow health
Hello! Canada
LOU LOU (English)
LOU LOU (French)
Maclean's
Mère Nouvelle
Mon Enfant
MoneySense
The National List of Advertisers
Profit
Pure
Québec Pharmacie
Shopping Centre News
Today's Parent

Awards

St. Joseph Communications has been recognized as Canada's 50 best-managed companies, and has won multiple awards for its publishing titles and content creation work. In 2017, the company has won two awards at the first Canadian Magazine Awards, three Vertex Awards for the St. Joseph's packaging work for Metro, and ten PAC Awards.

References

External links

Magazine publishing companies of Canada
Companies based in Toronto
Publishing companies established in 1956
1956 establishments in Ontario